Paris is a live album recorded by The Cure at Le Zénith de Paris, in October 1992 during their Wish tour, but released in October 1993. The band announced the album in July 1993.

Paris was released at the same time as Show, which was recorded in the United States. The album features more cult classics like "The Figurehead" and "One Hundred Years" than Show, which is generally more single-friendly.

50% of the royalties earned by the album were given to the Red Cross and Red Crescent Movement charities in support of their international relief work.

In mid-1996, Billboard reported that Paris had sold 95,000 copies in the United States by that point, much less than the 213,000 copies of Show sold there by the same point. The magazine described the release of the album "within a few weeks" of Show as exemplifying the "unorthodox career path" that the band had taken.

Michele Kirsch of Vox praised the album's "top shelf sound engineers" and "good editing". Rating the album eight out of ten, he noted "there's nothing here that doesn't work."

Track listing
"The Figurehead" (Pornography) – 7:26
"One Hundred Years" (Pornography) – 7:15
"At Night" (Seventeen Seconds) – 6:39
"Play for Today" (Seventeen Seconds) – 3:50
"Apart" (Wish) – 6:37
"In Your House" (Seventeen Seconds) – 3:59
"Lovesong" (Disintegration) – 3:31
"Catch" (Kiss Me, Kiss Me, Kiss Me) – 2:41
"A Letter to Elise" (Wish) – 4:50
"Dressing Up" (The Top) – 2:49
"Charlotte Sometimes" (stand-alone single) – 3:58
"Close to Me" (The Head on the Door) – 3:57

Personnel
Robert Smith – vocals, guitar
Simon Gallup – bass guitar
Porl Thompson – guitar
Boris Williams – drums
Perry Bamonte – keyboard, guitar

Production
Robbie Williams – production manager
Howard Hopkins – stage manager
Tom Wilson – keyboard tech and backstage coordinator

References

The Cure live albums
1993 live albums
Fiction Records live albums
Elektra Records live albums